St. Vincent's Academy (SVA) is a private, Catholic, all-girls high school located next to the Cathedral of St. John the Baptist in downtown Savannah, Georgia, United States. The school operates within the Roman Catholic Diocese of Savannah and enrolls about 350 girls in grades 9-12.

Notable alumni

The early history of St. Vincent's is intertwined with that of Savannah and the South. During the Civil War, eight-year-old Maggie Davis, whose father Jefferson Davis was President of the Confederate States of America, became a student at St. Vincent's. Her brother also came to the convent daily to recite his lessons.

Notable faculty
Sister Mary Melanie Holliday, Catholic nun and schoolteacher

See also

 National Catholic Educational Association

References

External links
 
 Roman Catholic Diocese of Savannah

Catholic secondary schools in Georgia (U.S. state)
Educational institutions established in 1845
Girls' schools in Georgia (U.S. state)
Schools in Savannah, Georgia
Sisters of Mercy schools
Savannah Historic District